Tugimaantee 20 (ofcl. abbr. T20), also called the Põdruse–Kunda–Pada highway, is a 28.3-kilometre-long national basic road in northern Estonia. Located on the east and west sides of national road 1 in Lääne-Viru County, the highway begins at Põdruse and ends at Võrkla.

See also
 Transport in Estonia

References

External links

N20